James Thomas (1710 – September 13, 1781) was an Alderman of the city of Swansea in Wales, and was elected Portreeve of Swansea five times between 1757 and 1772.

On November 19, 1734, he married Frances Mollyne, at St. Mary's Church, Swansea aged 24.

Elected as Portreeve of Swansea in 1757, 1762 (alongside Christopher Rogers and John Gwyther), 1763, 1768 (as deputy to William Powell) and finally in 1772 (with Phillip Rogers as his deputy).

He died in Swansea on September 13, 1781, and is buried at St. Mary's Churchyard. His headstone was subsequently destroyed during the 'Three Nights Blitz' of Swansea in 1941 by the German Luftwaffe.

St. Mary's Sextons book of memorial inscriptions of 1857 says his headstone read as follows:

Sacred to the memory of James Thomas, alderman of this town who died Sept 13th 1781 aged 71 years.

Politicians from Swansea
1710 births
1781 deaths